Larry Clapp (October 4, 1946 – January 7, 2013) was an American lawyer and politician.

Clapp served in the Wyoming House of Representatives, as a Democrat, in 1978–1979, on the Casper, Wyoming city council and as mayor in 1988. He practiced law.

On October 3, 2012, Clapp was arrested after a months-long investigation after his IP address was flagged as possibly having accessed child pornography on the internet. Authorities obtained a search warrant and found over 100 movie files related to child pornography on his computer's hard drive, as well as on an external drive.  His attorney waived a preliminary hearing in November and was expected to file status reports, along with the district attorney, on January 4, 2013. On January 7, Clapp was found dead from an apparent self-inflicted gunshot wound at Crossroads Park in Casper, Wyoming.

Notes

1946 births
2013 deaths
American politicians who committed suicide
Politicians from Casper, Wyoming
Wyoming lawyers
Mayors of places in Wyoming
Wyoming city council members
Democratic Party members of the Wyoming House of Representatives
Suicides by firearm in Wyoming
University of Wyoming alumni
University of Wyoming College of Law alumni
20th-century American lawyers
2013 suicides